Norbert Lichtenegger (born 14 November 1951) is an Austrian former footballer who played for Wiener Sport-Club in the Austrian Football Bundesliga.

References

1951 births
Living people
Association football defenders
Austrian footballers
Austrian Football Bundesliga players
Wiener Sport-Club players
First Vienna FC players
1. Simmeringer SC players